The Seagnat Control System (sometimes spelled SeaGnat or Sea Gnat) is a British decoy system produced by System Engineering & Assessment (SEA) Ltd firing rounds produced by Chemring Countermeasures Ltd used on many NATO warships to safeguard against incoming missiles. 

Each unit consists of six launchers that can be loaded with different rounds, depending on the threat:
Mk214 Seduction Chaff
Mk216 Distraction Chaff
Mk245 "GIANT" IR Round
Mk251 "siren" Active Decoy Round (only on later "DLH" versions)

The rounds are launched as decoys to trick incoming missiles into missing the ship or to prematurely detonating.

Rounds are launched from NATO standard 130mm Mark 36 SRBOC launchers, either fixed or trainable, and typically mounted in groups of around six barrels.

The Active Decoy Round has three phases: a low g rocket motor to project it away from the ship, a drogue to slow the round, and a parasail wing that allows the decoy to slowly maneuver as it descends to the water. It is powered by a thermal battery and its on-board computer allows the transmitters to radiate in either deception mode or noise (smart or barrage).

References

External links 

Missile countermeasures
Missile defense